
Year 307 (CCCVII) was a common year starting on Wednesday (link will display the full calendar) of the Julian calendar. At the time, it was known as the Year of the Consulship of Severus and Maximinus (or, less frequently, year 1060 Ab urbe condita). The denomination 307 for this year has been used since the early medieval period, when the Anno Domini calendar era became the prevalent method in Europe for naming years.

Events 
 By place 

 Roman Empire 
 Winter: Emperor Galerius wins his second victory over the Sarmatians.
 Galerius sends Valerius Severus with the army of northern Italy, to suppress the rebellion in Rome. However, faced with their former emperor Maximian, the soldiers desert him, and Severus flees to Ravenna. Maximian besieges Severus in Ravenna, who then surrenders. Maxentius makes Severus a hostage, in an attempt to keep Galerius at bay.
 Summer: Anticipating an offensive by Galerius, Maximian travels to Gaul to make an alliance with Constantine I. 
 Late summer or autumn: Galerius invades Italy but Maxentius remains behind the walls of Rome. Galerius finds he cannot besiege the city, and the image of an emperor making efforts against Rome hurts Galerius' image among the troops. The fact that Maxentius is his son-in-law does not help, and Maxentius makes an effort to bribe Galerius' troops. Galerius unsuccessfully attempts to negotiate, and recognizing Maxentius' attempts at bribery and the danger of being trapped in Italy by Maximian and Constantine, Galerius chooses to withdraw from Italy. To satiate his troops during the withdrawal, he pillages the Italian countryside. Meanwhile, Maxentius executes Severus.
 December: Constantine marries Maximian's daughter Fausta, and is promoted to Augustus by Maximian.
 Near the end of the year, Galerius gives his wife (Diocletian's daughter) Galeria Valeria the title of Augusta.

 China 
 January 8 – Emperor Hui of Jin dies after a 16-year reign, in which eight dukes of the imperial family have conducted a civil war (War of the Eight Princes) against each other in a struggle for power. Huai of Jin, age 23, succeeds his father and becomes the third ruler of the Jin Dynasty.

Births 
 Zhang Jun, Chinese prince of the Jin Dynasty (d. 346)

Deaths 

 January 8 – Hui of Jin, Chinese emperor of the Jin Dynasty (b. 259)
 September 16 – Severus II, Roman emperor (murdered)
 Septimius of Iesi, German bishop, martyr and saint
 Tuoba Luguan, Chinese chieftain of the Tuoba clan

References